Chamborigaud is a commune in the Gard department in southern France.

The village is known for its stunning viaduct, designed by Charles Dombre, the construction of which ended in 1867. Unlike most other bridges of this type, the curve of the Viaduct of Chamborigaud faces upstream.

Population

See also
Communes of the Gard department

References

External links

The Regordane Way or St Gilles Trail, which passes through Chamborigaud.

Communes of Gard